Ramponio Verna was a comune (municipality) in the Province of Como in the Italian region Lombardy, located about  north of Milan and about  north of Como.

References

Cities and towns in Lombardy